Properdin is protein that in humans is encoded by the CFP (complement factor properdin) gene.

Properdin is plasma glycoprotein that activates the complement system of the innate immune system.  This protein binds to bacterial cell walls and dying human cells to stabilize the C3 and C5-convertase enzyme complexes to form an attack complex that lead to the lysis of the cell.

Structure
Properdin is a gamma globulin protein composed of multiple identical protein subunits with a separate ligand-binding site. Native properdin occurs in head-to-tail dimers, trimers and tetramers in the fixed ratio 22:52:28.

Function
It is known that it participates in some specific immune responses. It plays a part in tissue inflammation as well as the engulfing of pathogens by phagocytes. In addition it is known to help to neutralize some viruses.

The properdin promotes the association of C3b with Factor B and provides a focal point for the assembly of C3bBb on a surface. It binds to preformed alternative pathway C3-convertases. Properdin also inhibits the Factor H – mediated cleavage of C3b by Factor I.

The alternative pathway is not dependent on antibodies. This branch of the complement system is activated by IgA immune complexes and bacterial endotoxins, polysaccharides, and cell walls, and results in producing anaphylatoxins, opsonins, chemotactic factors, and the membrane attack complex, all of which help fight pathogens.

History
Properdin was discovered in 1954 by Dr. Louis Pillemer of the Institute of Pathology (now the Department of Pathology at Case Western Reserve University).

Deficiency
Properdin deficiency is a rare X-linked disease in which properdin is deficient. Affected individuals are susceptible to fulminant meningococcal disease.

References

External links
 

Complement system